Litva Hoard is a medieval treasure found in Litva (Літва) village in Maladzyechna Raion, western Belarus. It was discovered in the early 1990s and contained a large number of Prague groschens (6,168 of them were acquired by the Museum of the National Bank of the Republic of Belarus) and a large gilded silver belt. It is the largest Prague groschen hoard found in the territory of the former Grand Duchy of Lithuania. They were minted in Kutná Hora during the reigns of John of Bohemia, Charles IV, and Wenceslaus IV (1310–1419). The ornate belt is an example of Islamic art and must have been a gift from the Crimean Khanate. It became known as the Belt of Vytautas because of speculations that it might have belonged to Grand Duke Vytautas though there is no direct evidence to support the claim.

Discovery

The discovery was made under unclear circumstances in early 1990s. Scientists were not informed and individuals attempted to profit by selling off the findings. The belt became known to the scientific community in 1994 when a collector contacted Professor Valentin Ryabtsevich. The belt was inspected by experts from the Hermitage Museum who verified its authenticity and the belt was added to the registry of cultural heritage of Belarus. Belarusian museums did not have enough money to pay the asking price and the belt remained in private hands. Ryabtsevich inspected the site and found additional coins and belt pieces. One eyewitness claimed that there were, in fact, two belts; the second belt was reportedly smuggled to France and offered to the Hermitage Museum.

Belarusian press began reporting on the Belt of Vytautas in March 2004. The belt was sold to a Russian firm which listed it with Paragis (Парагис) auction house in November 2005. The initial bid price was set at US$80,000. The item was not sold, possibly because as a registered item of cultural heritage of Belarus it cannot be transported outside of Belarus. The auction attracted further public attention and in 2006 the Supreme Court of Belarus ruled to nationalize the belt. It is now kept by the Belarusian National History Museum. It was exhibited at the Palace of the Grand Dukes of Lithuania in Vilnius in April–July 2015.

Belt of Vytautas
The belt has 2 star-shaped discs with 16 "rays" each, 9 smaller round discs, a buckle, two rectangular buckle ends, and 5 rectangular connecting strips, all produced from high quality silver (96% purity). The set weighs . The discs are richly decorated with scrolls, floral motifs, basilisks eating each other's tails, and birds created using the toreutics technique. The smaller discs feature a prominent darkened (niello) motif of three symmetrical interlocking ovals. The belt combines western and eastern art traditions: the buckle shows features of Gothic art from Venice and Lombardy while the round discs exhibits features of Islamic art. The pieces were most likely produced separately in Italy, possibly Geona, and in Kaffa (now Feodosia, Crimea) between the end of the 14th century and the first half of the 15th century.

The popular theory, which gave it the name Belt of Vytautas, has it that the belt was a gift from Hacı I Giray, the first Khan of the Crimean Khanate, to Grand Duke Vytautas. Hacı I Giray was born in exile in the Grand Duchy of Lithuania and received help from Vytautas in his dynastic struggles. It is known that Vytautas received Tatar envoys in August 1428; the location of the meeting was first read as Minsk but later research corrected it to Mtsensk. One argument against this theory is that the belt is silver, while other gifted belts known from written records are gold. For example, Ivan Olshansky gifted a golden belt to Grand Duke Jogaila and Vytautas gifted a golden belt and spurs to Benedict Makrai when he arrived to mediate territorial disputes in the aftermath of the Peace of Thorn (1411). Belarusian historian Oleg Litskevich pointed out to a document showing that a Tatar blacksmith lived in Maladzyechna in 1448–49 and suggested that the belt might be related to his work.

References

Treasure troves of Belarus
1990s archaeological discoveries
Treasure troves of Medieval Europe